Bansko is a Bulgarian professional association football club from the town of Bansko, currently playing in the South-West Third League, the third division of Bulgarian football. Its home matches take place at the Saint Petar Stadium.

The club was founded in 1951. Until the 2008–09 season, the team participated in either the amateurs Bulgarian divisions. After the union by the two clubs from Blagoevgrad – "Pirin" and "Pirin 1931", FC Bansko took licence of Pirin for participation in the West B Group.

History

Bansko was founded in 1951. The team has largely played in regional leagues throughout its history. The team enjoyed more success in the 21st century. Bansko promoted to the B PFG for the first time in 2009. A strong selection of players led to success in the second tier of Bulgarian football. In their debut season, Bansko finished third, very close to securing promotion to the top tier. During this season, 2009-10 season, Bansko managed to finish in third place, with 59 points, equal with Akademik Sofia on points. However, Akademik had a better goal difference, and were placed second, thus being promoted to the first tier at the expense of Bansko.

Honours
B Group:
3rd place (1): 2009–10

Bulgarian Cup:
 Third Round (2): 2007–08, 2012–13

Current squad

League positions

Managers

Past seasons

References

External links 
 Bansko at bgclubs.eu

 
Bansko
1951 establishments in Bulgaria